The 2021 League of Ireland season was Bohemian Football Club's 131st year in their history and their 37th consecutive season in the League of Ireland Premier Division since it became the top tier of Irish football. Bohemians participated in the FAI Cup, the national domestic cup competition, reaching their first final since 2008. Bohemians also competed in the inaugural UEFA Europa Conference League where they set a record for Irish clubs with four consecutive victories in European competition.

Prior to the commencement of the season, and despite no guarantees of live attendances due to the COVID-19 pandemic in the Republic of Ireland, Bohemians announced that they had a record 1,000 members signed up for the forthcoming campaign.

Club

Kits

Supplier: O'Neills | Sponsor: Des Kelly Interiors

Home
The new home jersey for the 2021 season was released on 16 December 2020 and is made by O'Neills, now in their third year as the official kit manufacturer for Bohemians, and features Des Kelly Interiors as the main sponsor. The home kit is in the traditional colours of red and black and the design pays tribute to the Dalymount Park floodlights. The silhouette of the famous lights passes through the red stripes of the jersey, and the Miller & Stables plaque from the floodlight control room adorns bottom of the embroidery. The club's name in the crest is written in the Irish language for the second consecutive year. The slogan "Love Football, Hate Racism" also features at the back of the shirt.

Away
Bohemians teamed up with Dublin band Fontaines DC for their 2021 away kit, highlighting the issue of homelessness across the country. The jersey itself 'pays homage to Dublin and Ireland in its design' and features the ‘Dublin in the rain is mine’ Fontaines lyric from their song 'Big' as well as Patrick Pearse’s quote ‘Beware of the Risen People’ from the wall of Kilmainham Gaol. It also features imagery of Dublin landmarks Grattan Bridge and Poolbeg Chimneys. The jersey launch was covered by many publications worldwide, most notably Forbes Magazine.

Third
Bohs retained their blue and navy yellow-trimmed kit from the 2020 season as their alternative away attire. This kit includes commemorative inscriptions for the 130 year anniversary of the club, which was celebrated during the previous campaign.

Management team

Squad

† Player out on loan

Transfers

In

Loan in

Out

Loan out

Friendlies

Pre-season

Mid-season

Competitions

Overview

{|class="wikitable" style="text-align:left"
|-
!rowspan=2 style="width:140px;"|Competition
!colspan=8|Record
|-
!style="width:40px;"|
!style="width:40px;"|
!style="width:40px;"|
!style="width:40px;"|
!style="width:40px;"|
!style="width:40px;"|
!style="width:40px;"|
!style="width:70px;"|
|-
|Premier Division

|-
|FAI Cup

|-
|Conference League

|-
!Total

League of Ireland

League table

Results summary

Results by matchday

Matches

FAI Cup

UEFA Europa Conference League

Statistics

Appearances and goals

† Player out on loan

Top Scorers

Hat tricks

Clean Sheets

Discipline

† Player out on loan

Captains 
{| class="wikitable" style="text-align:center;width:75%;"
|-
! style=background:#990000;color:#000000| No.
! style=background:#990000;color:#000000| Pos.
! style=background:#990000;color:#000000| Player
! style=background:#990000;color:#000000| No. Games
! style=background:#990000;color:#000000| Notes
|-
| 16
| MF
|  Keith Buckley
| 34
| Captain
|-
| 5
| DF
|  Rob Cornwall
| 7
| Vice-Captain
|-
| 3
| DF
|  Anto Breslin
| 3
|
|-
| 19
| DF
|  Tyreke Wilson
| 1
|
|-
| 10
| MF
|  Keith Ward
| 1
|
|-
| 1
| GK
|  James Talbot
| 1
|
|-

International call-ups

Republic of Ireland National Team

Republic of Ireland Under 21 National Team

Republic of Ireland Under 19 National Team

Awards

References

Bohemian F.C. seasons
2021 League of Ireland Premier Division by club